This is a list of military commanders who served in armed groups during the Central African Republic Civil War. They are listed by their most recent military allegiance. Symbols near their names indicate their fate:
  – killed during fighting,
  – died for other reason while being active,
  – dropped his weapons and is no longer leading any fighters,
  – awaiting trial in jail.
  – jailed and subsequently acquitted.
   – convicted and serving his sentence.
  – convicted, completed his sentence.
Those with names in bold are reportedly still active in armed groups as of 2022. Fate of others in the list is unknown.

Anti-balaka 
 Maxime Mokom  – leader of Mokom branch. One of the signatories of 2019 peace agreement. Arrested in 2021 by the International Criminal Court.
 Dieudonné Ndomaté  – leader of Ngaïssona branch.  One of the signatories of 2019 peace agreement. Arrested on 11 May 2021 in Bouca. Acquitted in 2022.
 Patrice Edouard Ngaissona  – former leader of Anti-balaka. Arrested in December 2018 in France.
 Alfred Yekatom  – arrested in November 2018.
 Eric Danboy Bagale   – arrested in September 2020 in France.
 Rodrigue Ngaibona (alias Andjilo)   – arrested in 2015, sentenced in 2018 to life imprisonment for war crimes in Bangui and on Bouca road.
 Thierry Lébéné alias "Colonel 12 Puissances" – former member of Ngaïssona's wing of Anti-balaka, in 2020 he joined pro-government forces.
 Guy Mazimbélet  – Anti-balaka commander killed on 26 September 2015 during clashes in Bangui.
 Sébastien Wenezoui  – deputy general coordinator, in August 2014 he created a political party.
 Ludovic Namsio – commander in charge of east Bangui, controlled Oubangui river up to Kouango together with Thierry Lébéné.
 Yanoue Aubin alias Chocolat   – Anti-balka leader in Bangui. Arrested in July 2014 by French forces, sentenced in 2016 to two years in prison, completed by time spent in jail. Joined CPC in 2020. Murdered by Wagner Group in Sido in May 2021.
 Urbain Samy alias Bawa   – former FACA soldier, Anti-balaka commander in 8th district of the capital Bangui, arrested in March 2016 by MINUSCA. Sentenced in December 2018 to 20 years in prison.
 Igor Lamaka – Anti-balka general, became coordinator of Ngaïssona branch following his arrest in 2018. Fled to Chad in 2021 together with other leaders of Coalition of Patriots for Change. In March 2022 suffered from stroke which left him partially disabled.

Basse-Kotto 
 Mathieu Gbotchando – Anti-balaka leader from Satema who in 2019 signed peace agreement. In March 2021 he looted building of ruling party in a village near Mobaye.
 Akim – Anti-balaka leader from Satema who in 2019  controlled the Mafunga Gia market, deputy of general Mathieu.
 Ludovic Angboyiondji –  responsible for repeated human rights violations against civilians including illegal detention and torture at Boulangba market. Assistant of Mathieu, in April 2019 he killed a man in his 20s.
 Ndagou – in April 2021 he reportedly led 50 fighters in Satema.
 Denis Azoundanga – Anti-balaka general from Ngaba village near Mobaye, responsible for kidnapping of women.
 Barthelmy Ngandji – Anti-balaka general from Kembé. In June 2019 he took two women hostage keeping them in a church.
 Aime Ngbando – Anti-balaka general from Yangbassi, who ritually killed a 14-year old girl to increase profit from mines.
 Bienvenue Nguiambi – Anti-balaka general commanding 10 men on Yeo island since 2019, in March 2019 he kidnapped 11 women. Responsible for kidnappings, theft, collected illegal taxes from people passing Oubangui river. In July 2022 armed forces attacked his base killing one fighter and arresting his father and brother, he managed to flee with group of fighter. In August 2022 he met with prefect of Mobaye expressing his willingness to join disarmament and handed 40 AK rifles.
 Francis – Anti-balaka general controlling Yamboro island, who participated in kidnapping.
 Grace à Dieu Bedambe – Anti-balaka general from Kesse island, who participated in kidnapping.
 Luc Ngaima – Anti-balaka leader from Zangba who in August 2019 had beaten up local official. In March 2021 he reportedly was forcing people in the locality to vote for Ahamat Hussein.
 Jean-Pierre Bida – Anti-balaka leader from Satema, aligned with a local peace initiative.

Haute-Kotto 
 Thierry Pelenga alias Bokassa, Anti-balaka leader in Haute-Kotto subprefecture
 Jean-Francis Diandi alias Ramazani, Anti-balaka leader from Bria
 Theophile Ndoumba  – Anti-balaka leader from Bria, killed on 25 August 2018 ex-Séléka fighters.

Kémo 
 Sioni Mènè – Anti-balaka general from Ndjoukou, in October 2022 he clashes with Anti-balaka faction led by Dimitri Ayoloma.

Lobaye 
 Habib Soussou – Anti-balaka leader in Boda since 11 April 2014 and in Lobaye since 28 June 2014. Subject to UN sanctions. On 1 June 2018, he was promoted by decree of the Minister of Defense as a master-corporal of armed forces.
 "Zaparo"  – former Anti-balaka leader from Batalimo village. On 20 April 2014 MISCA soldiers tortured him and killed him.

Mambéré-Kadéï 
 Kevin Padom alias "Kempo" – in 2017 he led Anti-balaka in Berbérati.
 Chrysostome Berba Yapele – commander of Berbérati in 2014.
 Aristide Bakafe – commander of Carnot in 2014.
 Nice Démowance/Demawanesse – commander of Gamboula in 2014. In 2017 he controlled mining sites around Amada-Gaza.
 Crépin Messamba alias "General Dalé" – a former member of the Presidential guard of François Bozizé, in 2017 he controlled mining sites at Sosso-Nakombo.
 Guy Wabilo – Anti-balaka zone commander of Gadzi. In April 2021 he reportedly was still engaged in exactions against civil population in Gadzi region.

Mbomou 
 Ferdinand and Herve Madambari  – two Anti-balaka leaders from Bakouma killed in 2018.
 Privat Sokomete – local Anti-balaka general from Bakouma who participated in looting the town in December 2020.
 Kevin Bere Bere, Romaric Mandago, Crépin Wakanam, Patrick Gbiako and Yembeline Mbenguia Alpha   – sentenced in 2020 for their participation in May 2017 Bangassou clashes.
 Ahmat Raymond – attacked Bakouma on 20 March 2017.
 Yvon Nzélété alias Kporo – former artisanal miner from Bangassou, organized 2017 attack on Bangassou. In 2020 joined Coalition of Patriots for Change.
 Mahamat Ngadé  – Anti-balaka general from Bangassou, killed in inter-group clashes in December 2017.

Nana-Grébizi 
 Max Narbé – Anti-balaka leader in Kaga Bandoro and Mbrès in 2015.
 Nguetemale Gauthier – Anti-balaka leader in Doukouma village in 2015. Signed a peace agreement in 2019.
 Franco Yagbegue alias Pelé – Anti-balaka leader in Blakadja village. He led several attack on Kaga-Bandoro–Mbres road in 2015.
 Colonel Pata – Anti-balaka leader in Maroka village in 2015.
 Kouazingo Gomez – in 2015 he controlled zone around Mboussa including the gold mine of Kagbi.
 Bertrand Gazamodo – Anti-balaka commander in Kaga-Bandoro in 2016. Signed a peace agreement in 2019.
 Leondie Yamake – Anti-balaka leader from Ndenga in 2017.
 Gustave Imguissa/Linguissa – Anti-balaka commander of Mbiti in 2017. Signed a peace agreement in 2019.
 Yves Toena – Anti-balaka commander of Doukouma in 2017.
 Alexis Maba – Anti-balaka commander of Ouandago in 2019.

Nana-Mambéré 
 Marcel Ndalé – leader of Anti-balaka in Bouar, together with his two brother Ibrahim and Adouma. As of August 2022 he remains active in Coalition of Patriots for Change.
 Aron Wilibona – controlled Cantonnier-Bouar axis in April 2014.

Ombella-M'Poko 
 Yvon Konaté  – arrested on 15 December 2020 near Bossembélé while travelling to Bossangoa, suspected of trying to join CPC rebels. Acquitted on 15 June 2022.
 Severin Ndoguia alias "Le Bleu"  – Anti-balaka general from Yaloke who following 2020 conflict joined government side. In 2022 his fighters committed attacks on Fulani community. He died on 29 December 2022 for natural reasons.
 General Witte – in 2017 he controlled mining sites around Pama area.
 Sylvestre Yagoussou – commander of Damara in 2014.
 Séraphin Keansem – commander of Boali in 2014.
 Sylvain Beorofie/Béorofei – commander of Bossembélé in 2014. One of signatories of creation of Coalition of Patriots for Change on behalf of Ngaïssona branch.
 Cyriaque Bondo  – formerly commander of Anti-balaka in Boda, he eventually dropped weapons and become a gardener.
 Jourdain Sélébondo   – formerly commander of Anti-balaka from Boali, arrested in 2016. On 28 August 2018 sentenced to life imprisonment for criminal association, murder, illegal possession of arms and munitions of war and armed robbery.

Ouaka 
 Dimitri Ayoloma - Anti-balaka leader in Grimari, responsible for killing of peacekeeper. In December 2020 he refused to join CPC and instead helped government forces.
 Edmond Obrou – On 21 March 2018 led an attack on UPC base in Tagabara. In 2019 Anti-balaka commander of Mambissu village, signed peace agreement with UPC. Recruited by Russian mercenaries in 2021, participated in 2021 Boyo killings. On 8 March 2022 he was arrested by another Anti-balaka general who handed him over to gendarmerie. On 11 April he was released without judicial authorization.
 Sossengué – Anti-balaka general from Atongo-Bakari. In March 2017 he supported attack on Bakouma. He participated in 2021 Boyo killings.
 Dago Isaac  – Anti-balaka leader from Alindao. Alleged of leading group of fighters who shot at MINUSCA forces on 20 December 2017. Arrested on 7 January 2018 by MINUSCA and transferred to Bambari. Later he participated in 2018 Alindao massacre, surrendered to government forces on 21 December 2021.
 Fally  – Anti-balaka commander from Kouango. In April 2016 he attacked village Ganemandji looting the office of a national NGO. He was killed by Anti-balaka general Gaëtan on 19 April 2016.
 Gaëtan Bouadé  – Anti-balaka general from Bambari, in August 2016 joined  disarmament process. On 10 December 2017 he was killed during clashes in Ndassima.
 Michel Mandakara  – since October 2014 he conducted several attacks against civilians near Kouango killing dozens of people. He was killed in September 2019 in a firefight with UPC.
 Mandayé  – killed by armed forces on 2 August 2020 during an attack on Grimari.
 Marcelin Madekanga  – zone commander of Bambari, arrested on 11 September 2018 by national gendarmerie, accused of robbing civilians in the Kidjigra neighbourhood.

Ouham 
 Dieudonné Ngaibona alias Dié    – brother of general Andjilo. Sentenced to life imprisonment on 27 November 2018 for 2015 kidnapping.
 Fulbert Bondo   – sentenced to life imprisonment on 27 November 2018 for 2015 kidnapping.
 René Linga – Anti-balaka general from Batangafo who was active in 2017.
 Eugene Barret Ngaikosset alias Butcher of Paoua  – Anti-balaka commander from 2015 in Ouham area, arrested in 2021 for war crimes.
 Florent Daniel Kema – Anti-balaka commander in Ouham in 2015. Run in 2021 elections in Nana-Bakassa, however his victory was invalidated by the Constitutional Court.
 Romain Finidiri  – Anti-balaka commander in Benzambe in 2015. In November 2018 he participated in a meeting in Batangafo with FPRC regarding ceasefire. In 2019 he became a stonemason thanks to UN-sponsored program to integrate former combattants.
 Joseph Kéma – commander of Bossangoa in 2015.
 Endjilo alias “sorcier” – in charge of Batangafo in 2014,  believed to have supernatural powers.
 Charlin-Chabardo Momokama alias Charli – Anti-balaka zone commander of Bossangoa since 2016. In February 2020 he kidnapped a Muslim child and tortured his parents.
 Hyppolite Gnikama - Anti-Balaka leader in Bouca.

Ouham-Pendé 
 Richard Béjouane  – former Anti-balaka leader from Bozoum. On 9 May 2014 after he started firing into air MISCA tried to arrest him. When he refused they killed him and his son.
 Zari Bienvenu alias Abba Rafael  – former Anti-balaka leader from Bozoum. On 25 April 2017 he kidnapped and raped 10 girls in Bocaranga. Killed on 29 April 2017 by one his fighters near Bang village.

Sangha-Mbaéré 
 Ferdinand Ndobadi  – former commander of Nola, laid down his weapons.

Central African Patriotic Movement (MPC) 
 Mahamat al-Khatim – leader of the movement, currently on exile in Chad.
 Ahmat Bahar – briefly led National Movement for the Liberation of the Central African Republic before rejoining MPC.
 Abdoulaye Ahamat Faya – former UPC general, after leaving the movement evacuated with group of dissidents to Kaga-Bandoro by MINUSCA. Joined MPC, was later based in Bria.
 Oumar Fadlala – former UPC general, joined group of dissidents led by Faya. Joined MPC, was later based in Bria.

Coalition of Patriots for Change (CPC) 
Note: Commanders of individual groups forming CPC are listed in their respective groups
 François Bozizé – former president of the Central African Republic, leader of CPC, currently on exile in Chad.
 Abakar Sabon  – former leader of Movement of Central African Liberators for Justice, minister in Djotodia government, spokesman of Coalition of Patriots for Change until January 2022.

Democratic Front of the Central African People (FDPC) 
In July 2019 FDPC fighter have fully disarmed. Group is no longer active
 Abdoulaye Miskine  – arrested in October 2019 in Chad.
 Justin Hassane - FDPC leader in 2006
 Marcel Bagaza  – former member of FDPC, nominated prefect of Nana-Mambéré prefecture in 2019.

Lord's Resistance Army (LRA) 
 Joseph Kony – leader of the group.
 Doctor Achaye – operates on the border between C.A.R. and D.R.C.
 Owila – operates on the border between C.A.R. and D.R.C.
 Dominic Ongwen    – captured in 2014 in the Central African Republic, sentenced to 25 years in prison for war crimes.

Movement of Central African Liberators for Justice (MLCJ) 
On 4 December 2022 official dissolution of the group was signed in Bangui
 Toumou Deya Gilbert  – MLCJ leader, also a government minister.
 Achafi Daoud Assabour – former UPC general, joined group of dissidents led by general Faya. In 2017 he joined MLCJ.
 Achille Modjekossa Gode – nominated sub-prefect of Ouadda in 2019.

Party of the Rally of the Central African Nation (PRNC) 
 Nourd Gregaza – president of PRNC.
 Issa Issaka Aubin  – first chief of staff of PRNC, killed on 27 March 2020 in clashes with Misseriya Arabs.
 Mohamed Ali alias B13 – participated in 2022 attack on Ouandja-Djale. Nominated as a chief of staff of PRNC.

Patriotic Rally for the Renewal of the Central African Republic (RPRC) 
On 4 December 2022 official dissolution of the group was signed in Bangui
 Damane Zakaria  – he was killed on 12 February 2022 by Russian mercenaries from Wagner Group in Ouadda together with 20 of his men.
 Djono Ahaba  – minister of transport, RPRC leader.
 Azor Kalité  – participated in 2020 N'Délé clashes. Arrested on 19 May 2020 by MINUSCA for war crimes.
 Amar  – participated in 2020 N'Délé clashes. Arrested on 25 May 2020 by MINUSCA. 
 Beladaine Tom – participated in 2020 N'Délé clashes and 2022 attack on Ouandja-Djale.
 Mahamat Deya – former bodyguard of Damane Zakaria, participated in 2022 attack on Ouandja-Djale.
 Anour 'Tom' Adam alias Bin Laden – RPRC general in charge of Sam Ouandja in 2021. Allied in 2022 with Noureddine Adam, nominated as CPC commander of Bamingui-Bangoran region.

PK5 self-defense group 
 Niméri Matar alias Force  – died on 1 June 2019 from sickness.
 Mahamat Rahamat alias LT – leader since 2019.
 Mohamed Tahir alias Apo  –  died in 2018.
 Issa Kappy alias 50/50  – killed on 30 October 2016 during fighting.
 Abdoul Danda  – killed on 30 October 2016 during fighting.
 Djido
 Ahmed Tidjani   – prominent ex-Seleka leader and deputy of Haroun Gaye. Arrested in August 2016 by MINUSCA. Sentenced to life imprisonment in 2018.
 Youssouf Ayatoulah Adjaraye alias You   – arrested on 12 December 2017 for assault and murder sentenced to life imprisonment on 17 December 2018.

Popular Front for Recovery (FPR) 
 Baba Laddé   – arrested in 2012, sentenced to 8 years in prison. Completed sentence in 2020, in 2021 appointed director of general intelligence for Chad. Arrested again on 26 December 2022.

Popular Front for the Rebirth of Central African Republic (FPRC) 
 Noureddine Adam – leader of FPRC, joined Coalition of Patriots for Change in December 2020.
 Abdoulaye Hissène – FPRC general, refused to join Coalition of Patriots for Change.
 Mahamat Saleh – participated in attack on Bakouma in December 2020..
 Aba Tom – in November 2022 based around Am Dafock. Injured in February 2023 during attack on Ndah.
 Haroun Gaye – former PK5 fighter, joined Coalition of Patriots for Change in December 2020. Currently on exile in Chad.
 Joseph Zoundeiko  – killed on 12 February 2017 while advancing on Bambari.
 Moctar Adam  –  gunned down by Russian mercenaries on 8 May 2022 in N'délé together with his two brothers while trying to evade arrest.
 Mama Amibe  – killed by Russians on 13 March 2022 in Tirigoulou village.
 Damboucha Hissein – participated in 2018 attack on Bakouma. Participated in attack on Bakouma in December 2020. In June 2021 present in Aïgbado near Bria.
 Faris Youssouf Ben Barka – participated in 2018 attack on Bakouma.
 Ousta Ali  – surrendered in Bria on 27 July 2021.
 Saléh Zabadi  – FPRC military commander, who was one of signatories of creation of Coalition of Patriots for Change, however he did not order his fighter to join CPC forces. Arrested in January 2022 in Chad.
 Kousko Abdel Kani  – brother of arrested Seleka general Abdel Kader Kallil, arrested on 10 November 2021 in Bria by Russian mercenaries.
 Ahmat Tidjani   – former right hand of Noureddina Adam, he was part of the group who together with Gaye and Hissene tried to escape Bangui in August 2016. Arrested by MINUSCA, he was sentenced to life imprisonment on 1 March 2018. 
 Yaya Scout  – FPRC general from Huate-Kotto, reportedly killed by MINUSCA in November 2016 during clashes in Bria.

Return, Reclamation, Rehabilitation (3R) 
 Bi Sidi Souleymane alias Sidki Abbas  – former leader of the group, killed during fighting in Bossembele.
 General Bobbo – current leader of the group.
 Issa Salleh, Mahamat Tahir and Yauba Ousman   – responsible for 2019 Ouham-Pendé killings, sentenced in 2022.
 Kaou Laddé  –  former chief of staff, killed on 25 March 2022 in fight with Russian mercenaries.
 Doborodjé Goska – chief of staff of 3R since 23 September 2022.

Revolution and Justice (RJ) 
In July 2019 Revolution and Justice fighter have fully disarmed. Group is no longer active
 Armel Mingatoloum-Sayo  – former leader of Revolution and Justice, currently minister in the government.
 Esther Audrienne Guetel-Moïba  – former leader of Bélanga faction of Revolution and Justice.
 Raymond Bélanga  – former leader of Bélanga faction of RJ, shot dead by MNLC fighter on 28 November 2017.
 François Toussaint  – Belgian mercenary, participated in creation of Revolution and Justice. Arrested in July 2014 in Bouar by MINUSCA, subsequently transferred to Belgium where he was sentenced in absentia to life imprisonment for murder.
 "Waluba"  – RJ commander, killed by MISCA in Gadoulou village near Paoua on 14 August 2014.

Séléka 
 Michel Djotodia  – former leader of Séléka and president of the Central African Republic since 2013 to 2014.
 Mahamat Said Abdel Kani  – Séléka general, accused of torturing prisoners in 2013 in Bangui, arrested in 2021, trial started in 2022.
 Djouma Narkoyo  – former spokesman of Séléka, arrested in April 2022 near border with Cameroon for war crimes committed in 2013.
 Abdel Kader Kallil  – Séléka general, accused of war crimes committed in 2013, arrested on 23 October 2022.
 Mahamat Saleh  – ex-chief of general staff in charge of operations for Seleka, killed in French operation in Bangui on 10 December 2013. (not to be confused with FPRC general with the same name)
 Markani Hamat   – former Séléka commander, responsible for killing a taxi driver in 2015 in Bangui. Sentenced to life imprisonment on 19 July 2018.
 Soumaine Ndodeba - former Seleka general and UFDR fighter

Séléka rénovée 
In 2021 Séléka rénovée fully disarmed and no longer has any fighters
 Mohamed Moussa Dhaffane – former leader of Séléka rénovée.
 Hissene Akacha – general coordinator of Séléka rénovée.
 Ali Issaka – provincial site coordinator of Séléka rénovée.

Siriri 
 Baoro Ndianigue – formerly leader of Siriri, his group eventually merged into 3R.

Union for Peace in the Central African Republic (UPC) 
 Ali Darassa – leader of UPC.
 Hassan Bouba –  minister of livestock and animal health in the Central African Republic and leader of splinter faction of the Union for Peace in the Central African Republic armed group.
 Abakar Amadou – UPC general from Haut-Mbomou, in late December 2022 he reportedly withdrew from disarmanement process.
 Idriss Ibrahim Khalil alias Bin Laden  – arrested on 23 July 2022 for his participation in 2018 Alindao massacre.
 Kiri – member of Bouba's faction, allegedly participated in 2021 Matchika massacre.
 Saleh Ngaïna  – killed by Russian mercenaries in June 2021.
 Moussa Issa – in October 2020 joined Bouba's faction.
 Ali Tato  – executed by Russian mercenaries on 7 December 2020 while trying to surrender.
 Didier Wangaï  – killed in clashes with pro-government faction of Anti-balaka in Gallougou village on 15 December 2020. His head was cut off and shown in Bambari.
 Djibril  – self-proclaimed colonel, started as UPC zone commander, later switched to Siriri armed group in Mamberei-Kadei prefecture. Then became 3R commander in the Dilapoko area. Later rejoined UPC and in March 2022 assassinated by his own men near Grimari out of suspicion of colluding with the Russians.
 Hassan Guéndérou – UPC commander from Haut-Mbomou. Participated in attack on Bakouma in December 2020. Joined Bouba faction in 2021. On 24 December 2022 he was arrested by gendarmerie, but was released shortly after.
  Ibrahim Garga – UPC general active in Ouaka province.
 Massaï – former commander of Mobaye, refused to join Bouba faction in October 2021.
 Souleyman Daouda  – member of UPC, in 2019 he became a minister in Touadera government. Died on 23 August 2020.
 Douha Mahamat  – killed in clashes with Wagner Group in Alindao on 9 January 2020.
 Mahamat Abdoulaye Garba  – UPC political coordinator, arrested on 24 January 2021 near French embassy, transferred in August 2022 to Ngaragba prison.
 Mamath Petit  - UPC general, killed by Azande Ani Kpi GBE in Bambouti on 15 March 2023.
 Ali Samtiago  - Killed in a clash with the South Sudanese armed group in Bambouti on November 2020.

Union of Republican Forces (URF) 
On 4 December 2022 official dissolution of the group was signed in Bangui
 Wagramale

Union of Republican Forces–Fundamentale (URF-F) 
On 4 December 2022 official dissolution of the group was signed in Bangui
 Askin Nzenge Landa 
 Régis Ngbenzi   – former members of UFR-F, nominated subprefect of Mongoumba in 2019.

References 

Lists of military commanders